{{Automatic taxobox
| image = Potamilus alatus (Say, 1817).jpg
| image_caption = Potamilus alatus
| taxon = Potamilus
| authority =  Rafinesque, 1818
| synonyms =  
 Anodonta (Lastena) Rafinesque, 1820
 Lampsilis (Leptodea) Rafinesque, 1820
 Lampsilis (Proptera) Rafinesque, 1819
 Lasmonos Rafinesque, 1831
 Lastena Rafinesque, 1820
 Leptodea Rafinesque, 1820
 Limnadea Agassiz, 1846
 Lymnadea [lapsus]
 Lymnadia G. B. Sowerby II, 1839
 Metaptera Rafinesque, 1820
 Monelagmus Agassiz, 1846
 Monelasmus Agassiz, 1846
 Naidea Swainson, 1840
 Paraptera Ortmann, 1911
 Pareptera Ortmann, 1911
 Potamilus (Lastena) Rafinesque, 1820
 Proptera Rafinesque, 1819
 Stenelasma Herrmannsen, 1849
 Symphynota I. Lea, 1829
 Symphynota (Symphynota) I. Lea, 1829
 Unio (Leptodea) Rafinesque, 1820
 Unio (Metaptera) Rafinesque, 1820
 Unio (Symphynota) I. Lea, 1829

}}Potamilus is a genus of freshwater mussels, aquatic bivalve mollusks in the family Unionidae, the river mussels.

Species
Species within the genus Potamilus include:
 Potamilus alatus (pink heelsplitter)
 Potamilus amphichaenus (Texas heelsplitter)
 Potamilus capax (fat pocketbook pearly mussel)
 Potamilus inflatus (inflated heelsplitter)
 Potamilus metnecktayi (Salina mucket)
 Potamilus ohiensis (pink papershell)
 Potamilus purpuratus'' (bleufer)

References

 
Bivalve genera
Taxonomy articles created by Polbot